The Gamely Stakes is a Grade I  American Thoroughbred horse race for fillies and mares age three and older over a distance of  miles on the turf run in late May annually at Santa Anita Park, Arcadia, California.

History

The race was inaugurated in 1939 as the Long Beach Handicap at Hollywood Park Racetrack in Inglewood, California over a distance of 1 mile. Then event was dormant until 1968 when it was run on the dirt for three-year-olds and older over a distance of  miles.  The following year the race was conditioned for fillies and mares at the distance of 1 mile.

In 1973, the distance was set at the current route of  miles with a classification of Grade II.

The race was renamed for the 1976 running to honor the U.S. Racing Hall of Fame filly Gamely who had died in 1975.  It was run in two divisions in 1971 and again in 1978.

In 1983 the event was upgraded to Grade I.

Following the closure of Hollywood Park, the race moved to Santa Anita Park in 2014.

Records
Speed  record: (at current distance of  miles)
 1:45.07 - Toussaud (1993)

Most wins:
 2 - Tipping Time (1970, 1971)
 2 - Astra (2000, 2002)

Most wins by a jockey:
 7 - Kent Desormeaux (1993, 1995, 1996, 1998, 2000, 2002, 2018)

Most wins by a trainer:
 8 - Robert J. Frankel (1990, 1992, 1993, 1995, 2001, 2003, 2007, 2008)

Winners since 1989

Earlier winners

1988 - Pen Bal Lady
1987 - Northern Aspen
1986 - La Koumia
1985 - Estrapade
1984 - Sabin
1983 - Pride of Rosewood
1982 - Ack's Secret
1981 - Kilijaro
1980 - Wishing Well
1979 - Sisterhood
†1978 - Lucie Manet / Star Ball
1977 - Hail Hilarious
1976 - Katonka
1975 - Susan's Girl 
1974 - Sister Fleet
1973 - Bird Boots
1972 - Typecast
†1971 - Tipping Time / Manta
1970 - Tipping Time
1969 - Foggy Note
1968 - Rising Market
1939 - Flying Wild

Notes:

† Run in Divisions

References
 The 2009 Gamely Stakes at the NTRA

External links
 Ten Things You Should Know About the Gamely Stakes at Hello Race Fans!

Graded stakes races in the United States
Mile category horse races for fillies and mares
Grade 1 turf stakes races in the United States
Horse races in California
Santa Anita Park
Recurring sporting events established in 1939
1939 establishments in California